The 2001 IGA U.S. Indoor Championships was a women's tennis tournament played on indoor hard courts in Oklahoma City, Oklahoma in the United States and was part of Tier III of the 2001 WTA Tour. It was the 16th edition of the tournament ran from February 18 through February 25, 2001. First-seeded Monica Seles won her second consecutive singles title at the event.

Finals

Singles

 Monica Seles defeated  Jennifer Capriati 6–3, 5–7, 6–2
 It was Seles' 1st title of the year and the 54th of her career.

Doubles

 Amanda Coetzer /  Lori McNeil defeated  Janet Lee /  Wynne Prakusya 6–3, 2–6, 6–0
 It was Coetzer's 1st title of the year and the 15th of her career. It was McNeil's 1st title of the year and the 41st of her career.

External links
 ITF tournament edition details
 Tournament draws

IGA U.S. Indoor Championships
U.S. National Indoor Championships
IGA U.S. Indoor Championships
IGA U.S. Indoor Championships
IGA U.S. Indoor Championships